George McCorkle (October 11, 1946 – June 29, 2007) was a founding member and guitarist for the Marshall Tucker Band. He wrote "Fire on the Mountain", the band's first top 40 hit, though had hoped that Charlie Daniels would record the song. He left the band in 1984 and later worked as a songwriter. He released a solo album, American Street, in 1999. McCorkle was diagnosed with cancer in early June 2007 and died soon afterward, in Lebanon, Tennessee.

Early career
George McCorkle pursued music as a career after having been drafted into the Navy and serving from 1967 to 1968.  Initially he had taught himself to play his older brother's guitar as a young teenager, mimicking the blues stylings of B.B. King and other artists he heard on the radio.  At the age of sixteen he purchased his own Gretsch guitar.  His first stage performances were with local high school bands in Spartanburg, South Carolina.

After his military discharge he formed a band, The Toy Factory, with his longtime childhood friend, Toy Caldwell.  George also performed with another group, Pax Parachute, but his musical talents flourished working with Toy.  "Playing guitar with Toy Caldwell wasn't just playing guitar, it was sharing a mind. With me at his side he had the freedom to do whatever came into his mind and I could instinctively interpret whatever that was and experiment with him. And Toy had a heart of gold."

References

External links
 
 George McCorkle entry in Dave's Diary
 George McCorkle entry at Pure Southern Rock
 Obituary on legacy.com
 George McCorkle interview on MarshallTucker.com

American rock guitarists
American male guitarists
Guitarists from South Carolina
American Southern Rock musicians
United States Navy sailors
2007 deaths
Deaths from cancer in Tennessee
Rhythm guitarists
1947 births
Capricorn Records artists
20th-century American guitarists
The Marshall Tucker Band members
20th-century American male musicians